Michael T. Joyce (born February 1, 1973) is an American former tennis player, who turned professional in 1991. The right-hander reached his highest ATP singles ranking of World No. 64 in April 1996. He also became a coach of professional players, most notably former world number one Maria Sharapova from 2004 to 2011.

Tennis career

Juniors
He reached the final of the Wimbledon Jr event in 1991, where he was runner-up to Thomas Enqvist.

Professional tennis player
On the professional tour, Joyce won 3 Challenger events and reached the 4th round of the 1995 Wimbledon Championships. He won the men's singles in the Ojai Tennis Tournament in 2004.

He was the subject of an essay by David Foster Wallace in Esquire; the essay was later republished in Wallace's collections A Supposedly Fun Thing I'll Never Do Again and String Theory.

Throughout his time on the tour from 1991 to 2003, Joyce won against Pat Rafter, Yevgeny Kafelnikov, Jim Courier and Michael Chang, and many    more top players.

Overall, Joyce's win–loss record is 46–67. He went 1-10 versus top 10 players.

Coach 
Joyce was the coach of Maria Sharapova, along with her father, Yuri Sharapov, from summer 2004 until January 2011, when he was replaced by Thomas Högstedt. During her cooperation with Joyce, Sharapova won three Grand Slam singles titles and reached the World No. 1 ranking.

Joyce coached American tennis player Jessica Pegula from 2012 to 2017. While with Joyce, in 2013 before suffering from an injury, Pegula reached a career high singles world ranking of 123 and a doubles world ranking of 92.

In 2017, Joyce coached former world number one Victoria Azarenka for 8 months after she returned to competition following maternity leave. However, with family issues interrupting her schedule, the pair split at the end of the year, and Joyce took up the position of coach to Johanna Konta. In October 2018, Joyce split ways with Konta and began coaching Eugenie Bouchard. In April 2019, Joyce split ways with Bouchard; two months later he started to work with Tímea Babos. In 2021, Joyce joined USTA Player Development as a women's tennis national coach.

Personal life

Joyce currently lives in Boca Raton, Florida, with his wife Jenna and their daughter (born May 2016).

ATP Challenger and ITF Futures finals

Singles: 10 (6–4)

Doubles: 11 (4–7)

Junior Grand Slam finals

Singles: 1 (1 runner-up)

Performance timelines

Singles

Doubles

References

External links
 
 
Esquire: "The String Theory," July 1996

1973 births
Living people
American male tennis players
American tennis coaches
Tennis people from California
Tennis players from Santa Monica, California